Montana Highway 17 (MT 17) is a  highway near the Canada–United States border.  The highway begins at the Chief Mountain Border Station and Quarters where it continues north into Alberta as Highway 6.  The highway winds to the southeast and ends at U.S. Highway 89 (US 89) north of Babb.  The road is known as Chief Mountain Highway due to its proximity to Chief Mountain, a prominent peak in the Rocky Mountains.

Route description

MT 17 begins along the Canada–United States border at the Chief Mountain Border Station and Quarters. On the Canadian side of the border, the road continues as Alberta Highway 6. The first  of the route lie within Glacier National Park. As the road winds through the coniferous forest, Chief Mountain dominates the landscape. Scenic viewpoints provide people traveling the road an opportunity to photograph the mountains. The road ends at US 89 a few miles north of Babb.

The road is classified by the Montana Department of Transportation (MDT) as an "off-system route", meaning that while it is a numbered highway within the state highway system, it is not designated as a primary or secondary road for funding eligibility.  As such, MT 17 is not maintained by MDT.

Major intersections

See also

 List of state highways in Montana

References

External links

017
Transportation in Glacier County, Montana